Alessandro Franchi (25 June, 1819 – 31 July, 1878) was an Italian cardinal and archbishop.

Biography 
His father was a notary. He studied at the Pontifical Roman Seminary, where he received his Doctor of Theology degree in 1841, followed by a degree in utroque iure from the Sapienza University of Rome. In 1842, he was ordained a priest and taken under the sponsorship of Luigi Lambruschini, the Cardinal Secretary of State.

In 1848, during the First Italian War of Independence, he was selected to become part of a sensitive diplomatic mission to Emperor Ferdinand I; an unsuccessful attempt to convince the Emperor that he should give up the Habsburg-held territories in Italy. Five years later, he served briefly as chargé d'affaires in Madrid. In 1856, he became the Titular Bishop of Thessalonica. Later  that same year, he was ordained a bishop by Pope Pius IX.  

He was also appointed Apostolic Nuncio for the city of Florence, which was then the capital of the Grand Duchy of Tuscany. In that capacity, he opposed the unification efforts of Count Camillo Cavour. After the expulsion of Grand Duke Ferdinand IV, the Grand Duchy became part of the Kingdom of Sardinia, so Franchi returned to Rome and was appointed Secretary of Church Affairs.

In 1868, he returned to Madrid, this time as Apostolic Nuncio, but was there for less than a year when he was expelled following the Glorious Revolution. After that, he was involved in preparing for the First Vatican Council. When the proclamation of Papal Infallibility caused a schism in the Armenian Catholic Church, he was sent to Istanbul to convince Sultan Abdülaziz that the Vatican's position was correct and ensure that Patriarch Anthony Petros IX Hassun would also be recognized as infallible. Thanks to the assistance of Mehmed Emin Âli Pasha, the Grand Vizier, he was able to achieve that goal, but the Vizier's death prevented the agreement from being formally applied. 

He was created a Cardinal on 22 December 1873 and, the following month, received the title of "Santa Maria in Trastevere". In 1875, he was appointed Prefect of "Propagande Fide" (now known as the Congregation for the Evangelization of Peoples).

At the Papal conclave held after the death of Pius IX, he was a supporter of Cardinal Pecci, who was elected and took the name of Leo XIII. Franchi was then appointed Cardinal Secretary of State and followed a moderate course. He had already made some diplomatic approaches to Bavaria and Prussia when he died suddenly, from malaria (although some suspected poisoning).

References

External links
  The Cardinals of the Holy Roman Church-Franchi @ Florida International University (Italian original by Giuseppe Monsagrati)
 Biographical data @ Catholic-Hierarchy.org 

1819 births
1878 deaths
Cardinal Secretaries of State
Diplomats of the Holy See
19th-century Italian cardinals
Cardinals created by Pope Pius IX
Clergy from Rome
Deaths from malaria
Diplomats from Rome